Hara is a 2014 Kannada drama film directed by Devaraj Palan and features actors Vasanth and Pragna in the lead. It is a remake of the 2006 Telugu film Chinnodu, where actors Sumanth and Charmy Kaur played the lead roles. The trailer of the film was unveiled on 13 December 2013.

Cast 
 Vasanth
 Pragna
 Dharma
 Sharan
 Sadhu Kokila
 Tennis Krishna
 Vinaya Prasad
 Avinash
 Rahul Dev
 Satyajit

Music 

The soundtrack album of the film has been composed by Jassie Gift, while lyrics have been penned by Jayant Kaikini, Keshavaaditya and Kaviraj. The audio launch of the album took place on 31 December 2013.

Track listing

References 

2014 films
2010s Kannada-language films
Kannada remakes of Telugu films